{{DISPLAYTITLE:C19H32O2}}
The molecular formula C19H32O2 may refer to:

 Androstanediols
 3α-Androstanediol
 3β-Androstanediol
 3α,5β-Androstanediol 
 3β,5β-Androstanediol 
 CGP-7930

Molecular formulas